William Erwin may refer to:

 Bill Erwin (1914–2010), American actor
 William Portwood Erwin (1895–1927), World War I flying ace
 William Erwin (American football) (1884–1953), American football player and U.S. Army officer